Horse Guards or horse guards can refer to:

 A Household Cavalry regiment: 
 Troops of the Horse Guards Regiment of the British Army from 1658 to 1788
 The Royal Horse Guards, which is now part of the Blues and Royals
 The Governor General's Horse Guards, the Household Cavalry regiment of the Canadian Forces
 Horse Guards (building), a building in Whitehall, London, formerly the headquarters of the British Army 
 Horse Guards Parade, the parade ground behind the building where the Trooping the Colour ceremony is held annually
 Horse Guards Road, the road between the parade ground and St. James's Park
 Horse guard wasp, a North American sand wasp which eats horse flies